Angela Tammy Dickinson (born October 6, 1973) is an American attorney who served as the United States Attorney for the Western District of Missouri from 2013 to 2017.

Education
Dickinson her received Bachelor of Arts in 1989 from Webster University and her Juris Doctor in 1998 from the University of Missouri Law School.

Legal career
In 2002, she worked briefly at the law firm of Bartimus, Frickleton, Robertson, & Gorny, P.C. She worked as Assistant Prosecutor in the Jackson County Prosecutor's Office from 1998 to 2002. She served as the Chief Trial Assistant for the Jackson County Prosecutor's Office, from 2002 to 2013.

United States Attorney
On July 12, 2012 she was nominated to be the United States Attorney for the Western District of Missouri. On November 29, 2012 she was reported favorably by the United States Senate Committee on the Judiciary and she was later confirmed by voice vote on January 1, 2013. She was sworn into office on January 7, 2013.

See also
2017 dismissal of U.S. attorneys

References

1973 births
20th-century American lawyers
21st-century American lawyers
Living people
Kansas lawyers
Missouri Democrats
Missouri lawyers
United States Attorneys for the Western District of Missouri
University of Missouri School of Law alumni
Webster University alumni
20th-century American women lawyers
21st-century American women lawyers